Patrice Robitaille (born 1974) is a Canadian actor and screenwriter. He is most noted as cowriter with Jean-Philippe Pearson and Ricardo Trogi of the film Québec-Montréal (2002), for which they won the Jutra Award for Best Screenplay at the 5th Jutra Awards in 2003.

He was also a Genie Award nominee for Best Original Screenplay at the 23rd Genie Awards for Québec-Montréal, and a two-time Jutra Award nominee for Best Actor for Québec-Montréal and The Little Queen (La petite reine).

Filmography

Television
 Watatatow (1990)
 4 et demi... (1995)
 Fortier (2001)
 La vie, la vie (2001)
 Rumeurs (2002)
 Le plateau (2002)
 Grande ourse (1 episode, 2004)
 L'héritière de grande ourse (miniseries, 2005)
 Les Bougon (1 episode, 2005)
 Miss Météo (TV film, 2005)
 Les Invincibles (2005)
 François en série (15 episodes, 2006–2007)
 Les Boys (16 episodes, 2007–2009)
 Toute la vérité (2010)
 Happily Married (C'est comme ça que je t'aime) - 2020

References

External links

1974 births
20th-century Canadian male actors
21st-century Canadian male actors
21st-century Canadian male writers
21st-century Canadian screenwriters
Canadian male film actors
Canadian male television actors
Canadian male screenwriters
Canadian screenwriters in French
French Quebecers
Male actors from Quebec City
Writers from Quebec City
Living people